Jefferson Township is one of twenty townships in Allen County, Indiana, United States. As of the 2010 census, its population was 2,109. Jefferson Township was organized in 1840.

History
The Craigville Depot, New York Chicago and St. Louis Railroad Steam Locomotive No. 765, and St. Louis, Besancon, Historic District are listed on the National Register of Historic Places.

Geography

Cities, towns, villages
 New Haven (east edge)

Unincorporated towns
 Maples at 
 Tillman at 
 Zulu at 
(This list is based on USGS data and may include former settlements.)

Adjacent townships
 Milan Township (north)
 Maumee Township (northeast)
 Jackson Township (east)
 Monroe Township (southeast)
 Madison Township (south)
 Marion Township (southwest)
 Adams Township (west)
 St. Joseph Township (northwest)

Four Presidents Corners, a monument, was built in 1917 where Jefferson Township meets with Monroe, Madison, and Jackson townships. All four townships are named after presidents.

Cemeteries
The township contains Emmanuel Cemetery.

Major highways

Airports and landing strips
 Casad Industrial Park Airport
 Klines Airport

School districts
 East Allen County Schools

Political districts
 Indiana's 3rd congressional district
 Indiana's 3rd congressional district
 State House District 79
 State House District 85
 State Senate District 14

References

Citations

Sources
 United States Census Bureau 2008 TIGER/Line Shapefiles
 United States Board on Geographic Names (GNIS)
 IndianaMap

Townships in Allen County, Indiana
Fort Wayne, IN Metropolitan Statistical Area
Townships in Indiana